In mathematical logic, the Brouwer–Heyting–Kolmogorov interpretation, or BHK interpretation, of intuitionistic logic was proposed by L. E. J. Brouwer and Arend Heyting, and independently by Andrey Kolmogorov. It is also sometimes called the realizability interpretation, because of the connection with the realizability theory of Stephen Kleene. It is the standard explanation of intuitionistic logic.

The interpretation 

The interpretation states what is intended to be a proof of a given formula. This is specified by induction on the structure of that formula:

The interpretation of a primitive proposition is supposed to be known from context. In the context of arithmetic, a proof of the formula  is a computation reducing the two terms to the same numeral.

Kolmogorov followed the same lines but phrased his interpretation in terms of problems and solutions. To assert a formula is to claim to know a solution to the problem represented by that formula.

Examples 

The identity function is a proof of the formula , no matter what P is.

The law of non-contradiction  expands to :
There is a function  that does this, where , proving the law of non-contradiction, no matter what P is.

Definition of absurdity 

A standard example of absurdity is found in dealing with arithmetic. Assume that 0 = 1, and proceed by mathematical induction: 0 = 0 by the axiom of equality. Now (induction hypothesis), if 0 were equal to a certain natural number n, then 1 would be equal to n + 1, (Peano axiom: Sm = Sn if and only if m = n), but since 0 = 1, therefore 0 would also be equal to n + 1. By induction, 0 is equal to all numbers, and therefore any two natural numbers become equal.

Therefore, there is a way to go from a proof of 0 = 1 to a proof of any basic arithmetic equality, and thus to a proof of any complex arithmetic proposition. Furthermore, to get this result it was not necessary to invoke the Peano axiom that states that 0 is "not" the successor of any natural number. This use of 0 = 1 validates the principle of explosion.

Definition of function 

The BHK interpretation will depend on the view taken about what constitutes a function that converts one proof to another, or that converts an element of a domain to a proof. Different versions of constructivism will diverge on this point.

Kleene's realizability theory identifies the functions with the computable functions. It deals with Heyting arithmetic, where the domain of quantification is the natural numbers and the primitive propositions are of the form x = y. A proof of x = y is simply the trivial algorithm if x evaluates to the same number that y does (which is always decidable for natural numbers), otherwise there is no proof. These are then built up by induction into more complex algorithms.

If one takes lambda calculus as defining the notion of a function, then the BHK interpretation describes the correspondence between natural deduction and functions.

References 

Dependently typed programming
Functional programming
Constructivism (mathematics)